Viralimalai is a legislative assembly constituency of Pudukkottai district in the Indian state of Tamil Nadu. It is one of the 234 State Legislative Assembly Constituencies in Tamil Nadu. It comes under Karur Lok Sabha constituency for Parliamentary elections. Elections and Winners from this constituency are listed below.

Extent of Assembly Constituency
Illupur Taluk(Except Komangalam village).
Kulathur Taluk (Part)
Kumaramangalam, Mathur, Singathakuruchi, Sengalakkudi,
Mandaiyur, Latchmanapatti, Mettupatti, Sivakamipuram,
Thennathirayanpatti, Palandampatti, Kalamavur, Neerpalani,
Amburapatti, Madayanaipatti, Suriyur, Perambur, Alangudi,Vilappatti,
Vadugappatti, Melappuduvayal, Kolathur, Odukkur and Vemmani villages.
Manaparai Taulk (Part) (Triuchirapalli District) Kavinaripatti, Puthakudi and Kappakudi villages**.
[**Although Kavinaripatti, Puthakudi and Kappakudi villages
are in Triuchirapalli revenue district, they are physically and
geographically located within the boundaries of 179-
Viralimalai AC.]

Members of Legislative Assembly

Election results

2021

2016

2011

1971

1967

References 

Assembly constituencies of Tamil Nadu